Lyubov Nikitichna Mulmenko (September 1, 1985, Perm, Russia) is a Russian playwright, film director and screenwriter.

Biography 
She graduated from the Faculty of Philology of the Perm State University with a degree in journalism (2008) and art journalism courses at the Pro Arte Institute in St. Petersburg (2009).

In 2009 she made her theater debut with two documentary performances.

Selected filmography 
As screenwriter
 What is My Name (2014)
 About Love. For Adults Only (2017)
 Fidelity (2019)
 The Danube (2021)
 Unclenching the Fists (2021; dialogues)
 Compartment No. 6 (2021; dialogues)
 Jonjolie (2022)
As director
 The Danube (2021)

Awards and nominations 
Awards
 Slovo Awards (2015) —  Best Screenplay Debut in a Feature Film (One More Year; with Nataliya Meshchaninova)
Nominations
 Nika Awards  (2015) — Discovery of the Year  (Combine 'Nadezhda'''; with Nataliya Meshchaninova)
 Russian Guild of Film Critics (2015) — Best Screenplay (One More Year; with Nataliya Meshchaninova), (Combine 'Nadezhda'; with Nataliya Meshchaninova);  (2020)  —   Best Screenplay (Fidelity)
 Kinotavr  (2021)  — Full-Length Film (The Danube)
Bibliography
 Zero One (play, 2009) 
 Invocation (play, 2010) 
 Antisex  (play, 2011)
 Funny Panic Stories''  (2016)

References

External links

 Из сценариста в режиссёры: Большое интервью с Любовью Мульменко

1985 births
Living people
Russian film directors
Russian screenwriters
Russian women film directors
Mass media people from Perm, Russia
Perm State University alumni
Russian women dramatists and playwrights
21st-century Russian dramatists and playwrights
Russian journalists
Russian women journalists
Writers from Perm, Russia
21st-century Russian women writers